The São Gonçalo Channel is a navigable channel connecting two large coastal lagoons, Lagoa Mirim and Lagoa dos Patos, in the state of Rio Grande do Sul in southern Brazil. At its eastern end, it separates the municipalities of Rio Grande to the south from Pelotas to the north.

References

Bodies of water of Brazil
Channels
Landforms of Rio Grande do Sul